William 'Willi' Moore  (born 2 April 1947) is a former British international cyclist.

Cycling career
He won the bronze medal in Team Pursuit in the 1972 Munich Games.

He represented England in the 4,000 metres individual pursuit, at the 1970 British Commonwealth Games in Edinburgh, Scotland. Four years later he participated in the pursuit disciplines at the 1974 British Commonwealth Games in Christchurch, New Zealand and won a gold medal in the 4,000 metres team pursuit and a silver medal in the 4,000 metres individual pursuit.

References

1947 births
Living people
English male cyclists
Cyclists at the 1972 Summer Olympics
Olympic bronze medallists for Great Britain
Olympic medalists in cycling
Place of birth missing (living people)
Medalists at the 1972 Summer Olympics
Commonwealth Games medallists in cycling
Commonwealth Games gold medallists for England
Commonwealth Games silver medallists for England
Cyclists at the 1970 British Commonwealth Games
Cyclists at the 1974 British Commonwealth Games
Medallists at the 1974 British Commonwealth Games